Burning Paradise (Foh Siu Hung Lin Ji 火燒紅蓮寺) is a 1994 Hong Kong action film directed by Ringo Lam. The film is set in the Qing dynasty and stars  Willie Chi Tian-sheng as Fong Sai Yuk  and Yang Sheng as Hung Hei-kwun.

The film was a box office failure in Hong Kong.

Plot 
During the Qing dynasty, young Shaolin disciple Fong Sai-yuk and his master, Chi Nun, are fleeing Manchu government agents hunting them. The two have become fugitives after the Yongzheng emperor gave orders to destroy the Shaolin Monastery for plotting to overthrow the government. While on the run, they meet a female prostitute named Tou Tou, who helps them hide. However, they are found by Manchu officer Crimson and his men. Crimson kills a wounded Chi Nun, and both Fong and Tou Tou are captured.

Fong and Tou Tou end up imprisoned at Red Lotus Temple, where other Shaolin practitioners are held captive. The prison's warden, Kung, is a hedonistic, power-hungry former general who forces the inmates to work as slave labor. He also booby traps the entire building to punish dissidents. To the Shaolin disciples' anger, Kung has enlisted one of their own, Hung Hei-gun, as the foreman. Hung and Fong fight until Fong is injured by a spear thrown by Kung. Left for dead in a pit full of corpses, Fong meets Shaolin master Chi Seen, who was also thrown down there.

Meanwhile, Tou Tou is taken as Kung's concubine. When offered a gift by Kung, she requests that Fong be released in exchange for her servitude. Kung initially agrees, but reneges after he becomes jealous of Tou Tou and Fong's relationship, throwing Fong back in jail. A love triangle is also revealed between head priestess Brooke and Hung, as well as between Hung and priestess Luk. Hung is caught by Brooke for looking at an explosives stash, but she lets him go. However, Luk betrays Hung, revealing him to be a double agent using his freedom as foreman to create a map of the temple for the inmates. His ruse uncovered, Hung helps Fong free the prisoners, who kill Luk in revenge.

The Shaolin disciples and Manchu soldiers clash, but the soldiers manage to partition and trap the disciples between gates. Fong and Hung escape the soldiers, and Hung reveals his plan to free the prisoners by blowing the traps up with explosives from a weapons storehouse. The two find Tou Tou held captive in Kung's bedroom, but Brooke encounters them and fights them both. She loses the fight when a broken bedframe falls on her leg and incapacitates her. A booby trap in the bed causes Fong and Tou Tou to fall into a pit, and the bedroom begins to fill with poisonous gas. Hung, grateful that Brooke spared him earlier, returns the favor and carries her out of the room before the poison can kill either of them.

Fong and Tou Tou follow the path to a catacomb of dead concubines. Meanwhile, Hung and a crippled Brooke make their way to where the explosives are stored, but a trap ends up killing Brooke. Crimson enters the catacombs and begins to fight Fong. At this point, Hung begins to detonate the explosives, causing the Manchu soldiers to panic and evacuate the temple. Fong and Crimson resume fighting in the main forge area, where Crimson is impaled by Fong's thrown sword and explodes. Hung, Chi Seen, and the remaining Shaolin members try to escape the temple, but are blocked off. Chi Seen asks the members to recite a sutra in front of a Buddha statue they find, but the Buddha is booby-trapped with firearms, shooting some of the disciples. A gloating, hidden Kung lures Fong and Hung to the battle arena with his voice. Meanwhile, the disciples' kowtowing opens a small hole above the Buddha, which they widen by lighting gunpowder near the statue. As the temple collapses, Kung reveals he is a powerful martial artist, using inked paper as powerful projectiles. Fong temporarily blinds Kung with his own ink, and the two successfully kill Kung by hanging him with chains. Everyone reunites and successfully escapes the temple, and Fong begins to escort Tou Tou back to her home on horseback.

Release
Time Out London referred to the film as a "A box office disaster in Hong Kong". After its release in Hong Kong on 27 March 1994, it grossed a total of HK$1,819,69. The film was the 145th highest-grossing film in Hong Kong for 1994.

The film was released direct-to-video in the United Kingdom. The film was released on DVD on 29 June 2010. The DVD contains an interview with Tsui Hark and the film's trailer.

Reception
Time Out London stated that "Some of the acrobatic fights do seem grimly anarchic, but the endless booby traps grow tiresome and the film's 'dark side' is undercut by feeble elements of humour and romance. As a genre piece: too little, too late." Film 4 opined that "Lam gives the story a new twist by envisaging the temple as a kind of Quake-type fortress complete with bottomless pits, traps, poison gases and other nasties that await the two fighters who are assigned to free the monks. Some amazing cinematography and art direction lift this endeavour out of the ordinary." The Austin Chronicle praised the film, stating that it is "Lam's bizarre direction that makes this one of the better chopsocky efforts in recent memory. He manages to make the genre's clichés seem brand new again, creating a considerably darker and more sinister piece than your typical martial arts picture" and that "Although the finale is a slight letdown, for the most part, Burning Paradise is a terrific movie that tells an old story with a new attitude." Variety referred to the film as "the highly entertaining but uncharacteristic swordplay item" in a review of Lam's later feature The Adventurers.

See also

 Hong Kong films of 1994
 List of action films of the 1990s

Notes

References

External links
 

1994 action films
1994 films
Hong Kong action films
Hong Kong martial arts films
Films directed by Ringo Lam
Discotek Media
Films set in 18th-century Qing dynasty
1990s Hong Kong films